Marcus Fayette Cummings (March 11, 1836 – 1905) was an American architect active in the Capital District region of the U.S. state of New York. Born in Utica, he later established his practice in the city of Troy, where many of his buildings are located in the Central Troy Historic District and listed on the National Register of Historic Places. Firm listed as Cummings & Brit in the Gazetteer and Business Directory of Rensselaer County, N. Y., for 1870–71. In 1891 he made his son, Frederick, a partner in the office, and promptly retired to Vineyard Haven, Massachusetts, on Martha's Vineyard. He maintained only a financial interest in the office of M. F. Cummings & Son, which would last into the 1930s.

Buildings
Verbeck House – Ballston Spa, New York
Glens Falls Insurance Company Building – Glens Falls, New York
Rockwell House Hotel – Glens Falls
North Adams Public Library – North Adams, Massachusetts (built 1865-67 as a mansion for Sanford Blackinton)
Johnson Manufacturing Company – North Adams (1872)
Saratoga Springs Town Hall; Saratoga Springs, NY (1871) 
Clinton County Courthouse – Plattsburgh, New York
Washington County Courthouse – Salem, New York
Stillwater United Church – Stillwater, New York
National State Bank Building – Troy, New York
Ilium Building – Troy
Rensselaer County Courthouse – Troy
Mt. Ida Presbyterian Church – Troy
School 1 Building – Troy
Jewett House (1872) at 199 East Main Street in North Adams. Eclectic brick and stone trim

Gallery

References
Notes

External links

1836 births
1905 deaths
Architects from New York (state)
People from Utica, New York
People from Troy, New York
People from Tisbury, Massachusetts